Thomas Murg (born 14 November 1994) is an Austrian professional footballer who plays as a winger for Greek Super League club PAOK.

Career

Early career
Thomas Murg was born on 14 November 1994 in Voitsberg, and at just age six he joined the youth academy at Atus Bärnbach, where he remained until 2010, moving on later to Sturm Graz.

Grazer and Austria Vienna
He soon moved on to Grazer AK, where he made his professional debut in 2010. He stayed at the club for two years, making 49 appearances and scoring 13 goals in the Austrian lower divisions, before then making a big step up and joining Austria Vienna.

There he made 19 appearances and scored two goals, playing for both the reserve and first teams, while he also won a league title in the 2012-13 season.

SV Ried
In 2014 he moved on to SV Ried, where his career took off. In two seasons at the club, he chalked up 44 games, eight goals, and six assists, establishing himself as one of the league's best attacking midfielders.

Rapid Wien
In January 2016 Rapid Wien came calling and signed him. Murg immediately took on a leading role in the team and has played a major part in the team's rise to prominence in recent years.

Overall, Murg made 163 appearances in a Rapid shirt, scoring 35 goals and contributing another 40 assists.

PAOK
On 5 October 2020, Murg signed a four-year contract with Superleague Greece club PAOK for an estimated fee of €2,200,000.
In his first year for the club, he played in 35 games with 4 goals and 3 assists. His contribution in the first semifinal of the cup, against AEK, was important, as with his own, very beautiful foul, the team of PAOK left the match victorious with a score of 1-0. The team of Thessaloniki qualified for the final, after beating AEK in the second semifinal with 2-1. With PAOK, Murg finally celebrated the Greek Cup for 2020-2021. In the final, PAOK faced OSFP and prevailed with a score of 2-1. He was on the team mission, but did not play.

Career statistics

Club

Honours

Club
Grazer AK
Austrian Regionalliga Central: 2011–12

FK Austria Wien
Austrian Bundesliga: 2012–13

PAOK
Greek Cup: 2020–21;Runner-Up :2021–22

References

External links

1994 births
Living people
Footballers from Graz
Austrian footballers
Austria under-21 international footballers
Austria youth international footballers
Grazer AK players
FK Austria Wien players
SV Ried players
SK Rapid Wien players
PAOK FC players
Austrian Football Bundesliga players
Super League Greece players
Austrian expatriate footballers
Expatriate footballers in Greece
Association football wingers